Gerard Granollers and Pedro Martínez were the defending champions but chose not to defend their title.

Dominic Inglot and Matt Reid won the title after defeating Romain Arneodo and Hugo Nys 1–6, 6–3, [10–6] in the final.

Seeds

Draw

References

External links
 Main draw

Andalucía Challenger - Doubles